Richard Pace (c. 1482–1536) was an English diplomat.

Richard Pace may also refer to:
Richard Pace (planter) (before 1590 – c. 1625), English early settler of Jamestown, Virginia
Richard Pace (architect) (c. 1760–1838), English builder and architect
Richard Pace (The Tudors), a fictional character in The Tudors loosely based on the diplomat
Richard Pace, a character in The Misfits

See also
Richard Paez, judge